Jorge Parra Sánchez (born March 14, 1994, in Guadalajara, Jalisco) is a Mexican professional footballer who last played for Inter Playa del Carmen. He made his professional debut with Guadalajara during a Copa MX victory over Mineros de Zacatecas on 5 August 2015.

References

1994 births
Living people
Mexican footballers
Association football defenders
C.D. Guadalajara footballers
Coras de Nayarit F.C. footballers
Inter Playa del Carmen players
Ascenso MX players
Liga Premier de México players
Tercera División de México players
Footballers from Guadalajara, Jalisco